Genbaku Dome-mae (Atomic Bomb Dome) is a Hiroden tram stop on the Hiroden Main Line, located in front of the Hiroshima Peace Memorial in Ote-machi 1-chome, Naka-ku, Hiroshima, Japan.

Routes
From Genbaku Dome-mae Station, there are four of Hiroden Streetcar routes.
  Hiroshima Station - Hiroden-miyajima-guchi Route
  Hiroden-nishi-hiroshima - Hiroshima Port Route
  Hiroshima Station - Eba Route
  Yokogawa Station - Hiroden-honsha-mae Route

Connections
█ Main Line
   
Kamiya-cho-nishi—Genbaku Dome-mae (Atomic Bomb Dome)—Honkawa-cho

Around station
 Hiroshima Peace Memorial
 Hiroshima Peace Memorial Park
 Hiroshima Municipal Stadium
 Aioi Bridge - the target of the Atomic Bomb
 ALSOK Hall
 Sogo
 Hiroshima City Children's Library
 Hiroshima Children's Museum

History
 Completion was started on November 23, 1912.
 Opened as "Yagura-no-shita" on December 8, 1912.
 Renamed to "Aioi-bashi" in 1929.
 Service was stopped on June 10, 1944 due to World War II.
 Service restarted on September 7, 1945 after World War II.
 Renamed to "Genbaku Dome-mae" on December 16, 1974.

See also

 Hiroden Streetcar Lines and Routes

References

Hiroden Main Line stations
Railway stations in Japan opened in 1912